Androtrichum is a genus of flowering plants belonging to the family Cyperaceae.

Its native range is Brazil to Northeastern Argentina.

Species:

Androtrichum giganteum 
Androtrichum trigynum

References

Cyperaceae
Cyperaceae genera
Taxa named by Adolphe-Théodore Brongniart